The Chatham Cup is New Zealand's premier knockout tournament in men's association football. It is held annually, with the final contested in September. The current champions of the Chatham Cup are 2022 winners Auckland City, who defeated Eastern Suburbs 1–0 in the final.

History

The Chatham Cup is contested by teams from throughout New Zealand, and has been held annually since 1923 with the exception of 1937 and 1941–44. Typically between 120 and 150 teams take part, with extra time and penalty shoot-outs used to decide matches which end in ties. In the past, replays were used, and in the early years of the competition the number of corners won during a game decided tied matches.

The cup itself was gifted to the then New Zealand Football Association by the crew of HMS Chatham as a token of appreciation for the hospitality they had encountered on a visit to New Zealand. The cup, which cost £150, was presented to NZFA President Sir Charles Skerrett by Captain Cecil Burnaby Prickett on board the Chatham on 14 December 1922. The actual trophy is modelled on the FA Cup.

The most successful teams in the Chatham Cup have been Mount Wellington (seven wins, two of them since amalgamation with Auckland University), and Christchurch United and North Shore United (six wins each). Most of the competition's winners have come from the main centres of Auckland, Wellington and Christchurch, though teams from Dunedin, Gisborne, Hamilton, Masterton, Nelson, and Napier have also won the competition, and the inaugural champions were from the small settlement of Seacliff, with many of the team being staff from the nearby psychiatric hospital.

The competition has been held every year since 1923 with six exceptions. The 1937 competition was cancelled due to a paucity of entrants (only 12 teams applied to take part), four competitions (from 1941 to 1944) were cancelled due to World War II, and the 2020 competition was cancelled because of COVID-19,.

The early years
Many of the early winners of the competition no longer exist, as competition was not effectively organised in New Zealand until the advent of a national league in 1970, and still remains largely amateur to this day. Many early New Zealand clubs have amalgamated with their neighbours or disbanded.

Prior to 1970, the final was held between the winners of separate North Island and South Island tournaments, with national semi-finals often being referred to as "Island finals". In the early years of the competition, each regional association found its own champion to represent that region in the Chatham Cup, leading to confusion in many of the early records with regional finals, island finals, and the national final all often simply being referred to in contemporary reports as "finals". Further confusion is caused by the incomplete nature of many of the early competition records. It is only since the first publication of an annual New Zealand football yearbook in 1965 that any systematic record-keeping began to take place; earlier match reports and statistics are complete only inasmuch as the vagaries of newspaper sports reporting allow.

Early Chatham Cup competitions were not well supported by the clubs, and the regulations surrounding entry to the competition were often financially prohibitive. The clubs themselves received only a tiny percentage of the money made in gate takings, and often had to travel considerably further to play matches than they did in the provincial leagues in which they competed. Concerns as to the costs involved and the limited financial support from the NZFA for entrants in the competition led to some teams disbanding as a result of the debts incurred, notably early winners Harbour Board, and the competition itself was so poorly supported by clubs as a result that it barely survived its first few seasons. Only some 30 clubs entered each of the first few years of the competition, despite over 450 clubs being registered with the country's football administration in 1924; South Island participation in particular was poor, with only a handful of teams entering in the first few years, and the 1937 Cup was cancelled after only twelve teams nationwide registered entries.

Despite this, large crowds often came to watch the matches, indicating their popularity with the public. The Wellington regional final in 1924 was played before a crowd of 1500 spectators, one in sixty of Wellington's population at the time, and the 1928 national final was watched by a crowd of 6000.

Post-war competition
Support for the competition among clubs has gained momentum since travel has become easier around the country and the financial regulation of the competition have been eased. Since World War II it has been typical for 100 to 150 teams to enter the competition.

Since the 1960s tournaments have been organised with a preliminary round and (occasionally) a qualifying round, four or five rounds proper, quarter-finals, semi-finals, and final. Competition begins in April, and the final is normally played in September. Early rounds are held on a regional basis, between teams within the country's three competition regions (northern North Island, southern North Island, South Island). Different publications often list different numbers for the rounds, making for some confusion as to whether the round before the quarter-finals is the fourth or fifth round in any particular year.

Between 1970 and 2003, when a national league was run between the country's top clubs, national league teams received byes to later stages of the cup competition. The current New Zealand Football Championship, which replaced this league, is contested between franchise teams rather than traditional clubs, and these franchise teams do not compete in the Chatham Cup. There is currently no formal system of byes to later rounds (as there is, for example, in the FA Cup). Several top sides do, however, gain byes through to the second round.

From 1986–1988, the final was contested on a two-match home and away series, but in other years the final has been a single match. In 1952, the final finished 1–1, and the title was shared. A replay was used to decide the 1970, 1972 and 1983 finals, and penalty shoot-outs decided the 1990 and 2001 finals.

Past winners

 1923 – Seacliff (Otago)
 1924 – Harbour Board (Auckland)
 1925 – YMCA (Wellington)
 1926 – Sunnyside (Christchurch)
 1927 – Ponsonby
 1928 – Petone
 1929 – Tramways (Auckland)
 1930 – Petone
 1931 – Tramurewa (Auckland)
 1932 – Wellington Marist
 1933 – Ponsonby
 1934 – Thistle (Auckland)
 1935 – Hospital (Wellington)
 1936 – Western (Christchurch)
 1937 – competition cancelled due to lack of entries
 1938 – Waterside (Wellington)
 1939 – Waterside (Wellington)
 1940 – Waterside (Wellington)
 1941–44 – no competition due to World War II
 1945 – Western (Christchurch)
 1946 – Wellington Marist
 1947 – Waterside (Wellington)
 1948 – Christchurch Technical Old Boys
 1949 – Petone
 1950 – Eden (Auckland)
 1951 – Eastern Suburbs (Auckland)
 1952 – North Shore United and Western (Christchurch) (title shared)
 1953 – Eastern Suburbs (Auckland)
 1954 – Onehunga
 1955 – Western (Christchurch)
 1956 – Stop Out (Wellington)
 1957 – Seatoun

 1958 – Seatoun
 1959 – Northern (Dunedin)
 1960 – North Shore United
 1961 – Northern (Dunedin)
 1962 – Hamilton Technical Old Boys
 1963 – North Shore United
 1964 – Mount Roskill
 1965 – Eastern Suburbs (Auckland)
 1966 – Miramar Rangers
 1967 – North Shore United
 1968 – Eastern Suburbs (Auckland)
 1969 – Eastern Suburbs (Auckland)
 1970 – Blockhouse Bay
 1971 – Western Suburbs (Wellington)
 1972 – Christchurch United
 1973 – Mount Wellington (Auckland)
 1974 – Christchurch United
 1975 – Christchurch United
 1976 – Christchurch United
 1977 – Nelson United
 1978 – Manurewa
 1979 – North Shore United
 1980 – Mount Wellington (Auckland)
 1981 – Dunedin City
 1982 – Mount Wellington (Auckland)
 1983 – Mount Wellington (Auckland)
 1984 – Manurewa
 1985 – Napier City Rovers
 1986 – North Shore United
 1987 – Gisborne City
 1988 – Waikato United
 1989 – Christchurch United

 1990 – Mount Wellington (Auckland)
 1991 – Christchurch United
 1992 – Miramar Rangers
 1993 – Napier City Rovers
 1994 – Waitakere City
 1995 – Waitakere City
 1996 – Waitakere City
 1997 – Central United (Auckland)
 1998 – Central United (Auckland)
 1999 – Dunedin Technical
 2000 – Napier City Rovers
 2001 – University-Mount Wellington (Auckland)
 2002 – Napier City Rovers
 2003 – University-Mount Wellington (Auckland)
 2004 – Miramar Rangers
 2005 – Central United (Auckland)
 2006 – Western Suburbs (Wellington)
 2007 – Central United (Auckland)
 2008 – East Coast Bays
 2009 – Wellington Olympic
 2010 – Miramar Rangers
 2011 – Wairarapa United (Masterton)
 2012 – Central United
 2013 – Cashmere Technical (Christchurch)
 2014 – Cashmere Technical (Christchurch)
 2015 – Eastern Suburbs
 2016 – Birkenhead United (Auckland)
 2017 – Onehunga Sports (Auckland)
 2018 – Birkenhead United (Auckland)
 2019 – Napier City Rovers
 2020 – competition cancelled due Covid-19
 2021 – Cashmere Technical (Christchurch)
 2022 – Auckland City

Bob Smith Memorial Trophy
The Bob Smith Memorial Trophy is traditionally awarded to the runners-up in the Chatham Cup, though this has not always been the case, notably in the years 1982 to 1997, when the trophy's location was unknown. Details of each year's runners-up can be found in the individual articles on each year's competition.

Jack Batty Memorial Cup
A Jack Batty Memorial Cup is presented annually to the player adjudged to have made the most positive impact in the Chatham Cup final. The trophy honours Jack Batty, who was both a member of the crew of HMS Chatham and also a three-time medallist in the early days of the tournament with Auckland Harbour Board, Tramways, and Tramurewa. The cup was donated by his son, John Batty, himself a Chatham Cup winner with Blockhouse Bay in 1970, and was first awarded to Greg Brown of Napier City Rovers in 1985.

 1985 – Greg Brown (Napier City Rovers)
 1986 – Duncan Cole (North Shore United)
 1987 – Dave Reynolds (Gisborne City)
 1988 – Steve Tate (Waikato United)
 1989 – Michael McGarry (Christchurch United)
 1990 – Michael McGarry (Christchurch United)
 1991 – Dave Woodard (Wellington United)
 1992 – Neal Cave (Miramar Rangers)
 1993 – Paul Halford (Napier City Rovers)
 1994 – Ivan Vicelich (Waitakere City)
 1995 – Darren McClennan (Waitakere City)
 1996 – Mark Foy (Mount Wellington)
 1997 – Ivan Vicelich (Central United)

 1998 – Terry Torrens (Central United)
 1999 – Aaron Burgess (Dunedin Technical)
 2000 – Jimmy Cudd (Napier City Rovers)
 2001 – Paul Bunbury (University-Mount Wellington)
 2002 – Leon Birnie (Napier City Rovers)
 2003 – Kara Waetford (University-Mount Wellington)
 2004 – Tim Butterfield (Miramar Rangers)
 2005 – Ross Nicholson (Central United)
 2006 – Phil Imray (Western Suburbs)
 2007 – Luiz del Monte (Central United)
 2008 – Ryan Zoghby (East Coast Bays)
 2009 – Raf de Gregorio (Wellington Olympic)

 2010 – Phil Imray (Miramar Rangers)
 2011 – Scott Robson (Wairarapa United)
 2012 – Emiliano Tade (Central United)
 2013 – Andy Pitman (Cashmere Technical)
 2014 – Stuart Kelly (Cashmere Technical)
 2015 – Miles John (Napier City Rovers)
 2016 – Tom Davis (Birkenhead United)
 2017 – Mario Ilich (Central United)
 2018 – Alec Solomons (Birkenhead United)
 2019 – Sho Goto (Napier City Rovers)
 2020 – Not Awarded
 2021 – Yuya Taguchi (Cashmere Technical)
 2022 – Dylan Manickum (Auckland City)

Cup records

Most cup wins

Most appearances in final

NOTE: An asterisk in the "most recent appearance" column indicates that the team won the Chatham Cup in the year indicated

Other records
Highest team score (final): 7: 
Seatoun 7–1 Christchurch City (1958)
Christchurch United 7–1 Rotorua City (1989)
Highest team score (any match): 21: 
Metro 21–0 Norwest United (Third Round, 1998)
Central United 21–0 Norwest United (second round, 2005)
Most goals in a final: 8:
Waterside (Wellington) 6–2 Mosgiel (1940)
Western 6–2 Eastern Suburbs (1955)
Seatoun 7–1 Christchurch City (1958)
North Shore United 5–3 Technical Old Boys (1960)
Christchurch United 4–4 (a.e.t) Mount Wellington (1972)*
Christchurch United 7–1 Rotorua City (1989)
Most winners medals: 6: Steve Sumner
Most final appearances: 8: 
Tony Sibley
Ron Armstrong
Most individual goals in a final: 6: John Donovan for Seatoun, 1958
Most teams entered: 174 (1991)

* Does not include two-legged finals. The 1972 match referred to is the first match, which finished 4–4.

Notes

External links
Official website
This year's tournament
Finals results and scorers
Finals results, with links to year by year competition details

Chatham Cup
National association football cups
Association football cup competitions in New Zealand
Recurring sporting events established in 1923
New Zealand sports trophies and awards
English-New Zealand culture